Koleje Dolnośląskie (Polish for Lower Silesian Railways; KD) is a regional rail operator in the Lower Silesian Voivodeship of Poland.

The company was founded on 28 December 2007 by a decision of the Lower Silesian Voivodeship Sejmik and is fully owned by the local government.

Train categories 
The only train category operated by KD is local passenger trains (osobowy).

Apart from KD's own tickets, tickets for Polregio's Regio trains are accepted on board of KD trains.

Rolling stock 
At first, the rolling stock consisted of diesel units provided by the Lower Silesian voivodeship government which had previously been used by Przewozy Regionalne (now known as Polregio): one SA106, one SA132, three SA134 and three SA135 Diesel multiple units. Additional Diesel units were purchased in 2010 (three SA135 vehicles), 2011 (three SA134 vehicles) and 2015 (modern Pesa Link units marked as SA139).

Koleje Dolnośląskie obtained their first electric multiple unit from Przewozy Regionalne in 2013 (it was an EN57AL which had been retrofitted the previous year). Three more EN57-class units were purchased and retrofitted at the cost of the Lower Silesian government. The company also purchased completely new electric vehicles – the first Newag Impuls units (31WE) were ordered in 2011 in a batch of five. In 2014 the operator ordered six Impuls 36WEa units; the following year, they ordered five more 31WE units. The largest order in KD's history was its purchase of eleven 45WE units in 2017, which, when the order was placed, were described as "the most well-equipped and comfortable trains in the country".

The company uses the following rolling stock:

Routes served by KD trains 

KD passenger trains run on the following routes:

  Wrocław – Legnica – Bolesławiec - Węgliniec – Lubań
  Wrocław - Brzeg Dolny - Wołów - Ścinawa - Głogów
  Wrocław – Żmigród – Rawicz
  Wrocław – Sobótka – Świdnica – Dzierżoniów – Bielawa
  Legnica – Świdnica – Dzierżoniów - Kamieniec Ząbkowicki – Kłodzko – Kudowa-Zdrój
  Wrocław – Wałbrzych – Jelenia Góra – Szklarska Poręba
  Jelcz-Laskowice - Wrocław - Olesnica - Milicz - Krotoszyn
  Wrocław – Trzebnica
  Wrocław – Strzelin – Kłodzko – Międzylesie – Lichkov (Czech Republic)
  Wrocław – Legnica – Węgliniec – Zgorzelec – Görlitz (Germany) – Dresden (Germany)
  Wrocław – Legnica – Lubin – Głogów 
  Wałbrzych – Nowa Ruda – Kłodzko – Kudowa-Zdrój
  Wrocław - Jaworzyna Śląska – Świdnica – Dzierżoniów – Bielawa
  Jelenia Góra - Lubań – Zgorzelec - Görlitz (Germany)
  Szklarska Poręba – Harrachov (Czech Republic) – Tanvald (Czech Republic) – Liberec (Czech Republic)
  Wrocław – Legnica – Żagań – Żary – Forst (Lausitz) (Germany) (connection to Germany only on weekends)
  Sędzisław – Kamienna Góra – Trutnov (Czech Republic) (only in summer)
  Wrocław – Wałbrzych – Mieroszów – Adršpach (Czech Republic) (only in summer)
  Wrocław – Kamieniec Ząbkowicki – Kłodzko – Kudowa-Zdrój
  Wrocław - Jelcz-Laskowice
  Kłodzko - Lądek-Zdrój - Stronie Śląskie
  Wrocław - Berlin (Germany) (only on weekends)

Formerly served routes 

 Wrocław – Wołów (now operated by Polregio)
 Jelenia Góra – Lwówek Śląski – Zebrzydowa (now closed)

See also
 Wrocław metropolitan area

References

External links 
 Official website

Railway companies of Poland
Polish companies established in 2007